Bifanaj (also Romanized as Bīfānaj; also known as Pīfānach, Pīfānaj, Pī Fīān, and Pifianeh) is a village in Jolgeh Rural District, in the Central District of Asadabad County, Hamadan Province, Iran. At the 2006 census, its population was 234, in 59 families.

References 

Populated places in Asadabad County